Marc Rosenberg (January 4, 1950 – August 27, 2015) was a Canadian lawyer and jurist who served as a justice of the Court of Appeal for Ontario from December 12, 1995 to March 5, 2014.

Born in North York, Ontario, Rosenberg graduated from the University of Western Ontario in 1971, and earned an L.L.B. from Osgoode Hall Law School in 1974. He participated in a criminal law practice with Edward Greenspan until 1995, when he joined the Ministry of the Attorney General of Ontario as Assistant Deputy Attorney General, Public Law and Policy Division and Civil Law Division. Rosenberg was appointed to the Court of Appeal for Ontario in 1995 and authored over 2,500 judgements. During that time he was noted for significant contributes in international judicial education. He was diagnosed with brain cancer in 2014 and died in 2015.

Legal positions

Some of Justice Rosenberg's positions and academic contributions include:
The positive impact of the Charter of Rights and Freedoms on Canadian criminal law
Similar fact evidence in criminal law
The possibility of eliminating plea bargains
Arguing the justice system had fallen into a state of disrepair due in part to mandatory minimum sentences

Notable cases
Justice Rosenberg authored decisions on:
Medical marijuana
Overturning the conviction of Stephen Truscott

Awards
 G. Arthur Martin medal for outstanding contribution to criminal justice,  2009

References

1950 births
2015 deaths
Justices of the Court of Appeal for Ontario
Osgoode Hall Law School alumni
People from North York
University of Western Ontario alumni
Deaths from brain tumor
Deaths from cancer in Ontario
Lawyers in Ontario
20th-century Canadian lawyers
20th-century American judges